JWA is John Wayne Airport in California, United States.

JWA may also refer to:

Businesses
Japan Pro Wrestling Alliance (1953–1973)
Japan Weather Association
John Wardle Architects, an Australian firm
 Johnson Outdoors, an American manufacturer (formerly Johnson Wax/Worldwide Associates)
J.W. Automotive Engineering Ltd, John Wyer's English racecar maker

Other uses
Jewish Women's Archive, American non-profit (founded 1995)
Jwaneng Airport, Botswana (IATA code: JWA)
JSON Web Algorithms, in Javascript programming; see JSON Web Token